Gennadiy Nikolayevich Tsypkalov (21 June 1973 – 24 September 2016) was a political and military figure of the unrecognized Luhansk People's Republic (LPR). For short time in May 2014, he served as acting People's Governor of the LPR, while Valeriy Bolotov was recovering from wounds.

Death
According to officials of the Luhansk People's Republic, Tsypkalov committed suicide on 24 September 2016.

According to some of Tsypkalov's colleagues whom Igor Plotnitsky dismissed however, the leadership of LPR murdered Tsypkalov. His true death cause is unknown.

See also 

 Separatist forces of the war in Donbass
 Alexander Bednov
 
 Roman Voznik
 Aleksey Mozgovoy
 
 
 Arsen Pavlov
 Valery Bolotov
 List of unsolved deaths
 Mikhail Tolstykh
 Alexander Zakharchenko

References

1973 births
2016 deaths
People from Millerovsky District
People of the Luhansk People's Republic
People of Anti-Maidan
Prisoners who died in Ukrainian detention
Pro-Russian people of the 2014 pro-Russian unrest in Ukraine
Pro-Russian people of the war in Donbas
Russian expatriates in Ukraine
Unsolved deaths
Ukrainian collaborators with Russia